Moira House School was an independent day and boarding school for girls aged 6 weeks to 18 years in Eastbourne, East Sussex, England, from 1887 to 2020, but founded in Surrey in 1875.

Moira House was an inter-denominational school.

On March 2017, the school had 312 pupils on roll, including ten boys, with 55 in the sixth form.

History 
The school was established in 1875 by Charles Ingham at Moira House in Surrey. Within a few years it had moved to Eastbourne. On 27 January 2018, the school merged with Roedean School as part of the newly-created Roedean Group of Schools and became known as Roedean Moira House. However, this lasted only two years, and the school closed permanently in August 2020, with most girls and some staff transferring to Roedean.

School houses 
The school had a house system, and sisters were usually allocated to the same house. The houses had names from myths and legends:
Excalibur, symbolised by a sword and the colour gold
Pegasus, symbolised by a pegasus and the colour white
Vulcan, symbolised by a flame and the colour red
Merlin, symbolised by a wizard and the colour green

Sports 
With views over the sea, the school grounds at Eastbourne opened directly onto the South Downs National Park, providing walking, cycling and pony trekking opportunities for the girls. Playing fields, including astroturf, provided for lawn tennis, cricket, football, field hockey, netball, lacrosse, and athletics. The school also had a 25-metre indoor heated swimming pool, and a sports hall. An equestrian centre was opened in September 2016.

Music 
Visiting staff taught cello, clarinet, flute, guitar, piano, recorder, saxophone, violin, vocal etc. Girls who wished to do so were able to take Associated Board of Examination music exams. The Chamber Choir performed locally, such as at Canterbury Cathedral. Every two years there was a Performing Arts Tour which involved flying to other parts of the world to perform, and destinations included San Francisco, Hong Kong, Australia, Dubai, and Barbados. The last tour was to New York City, where the choir sang at the Empire State Building, the United Nations Building and the Statue of Liberty. Girls could study musical theatre and take LAMDA exams in drama.

Notable former pupils 
Isabelle Allen (born 2002), actress
Susannah Corbett (born 1968), actress and author
Karin Giannone (born 1974), news presenter at BBC News
Rumer Godden (1907–1998), author
Katharine Gun (born 1974), British linguist and whistleblower
Gina Miller (born 1965), initiator of R (Miller) v Secretary of State for Exiting the European Union 
Christina Oxenberg (born 1962), writer and journalist 
Prunella Scales (born 1932), actress

Closure

In March 2020, Andrew Pianca, chairman of governors of Roedean Moira House, announced: “It is with great sadness and regret that we have taken the difficult decision to close Roedean Moira House. Our legal advisors tell us it is the only route available to us.” The decision was blamed on falling numbers of pupils and “financial losses that we cannot sustain”.

The school permanently closed in August 2020.

An Educational Needs Assessment explored the reasons behind the closure, finding that the school “suffered material operational losses for the financial year ending 2019” and that economic difficulties had been caused by lower demand for independent school places in the Eastbourne area. On 31 May 2022 approval was given for a plan to redevelop the five-acre Moira House School campus into a residential development of 33 apartments and 19 houses. The school’s ancillary buildings, including the gym and swimming pool, would be demolished, but the three original 19th-century houses would be turned into housing.

References

External links 
 

 https://gsa.uk.com/school/moira-house-girls-school/

Defunct schools in East Sussex
Girls' schools in East Sussex
Schools in Eastbourne
Boarding schools in East Sussex
Educational institutions disestablished in 2020
2020 disestablishments in England